Chou Yuan-chin is a Taiwanese politician. He was the Minister of the Atomic Energy Council in the Executive Yuan from 1 February to 20 May 2016.

Education
Chou earned bachelor's and master's degree in nuclear engineering from National Tsing Hua University. He then received his doctoral degree in the same field from Massachusetts Institute of Technology.

Early career
Chou had been an adjunct lecturer at the Department of Mechanical Engineering of Chung Cheng Institute of Technology in 1979–1981. In 1984–1985, he was the adjunct lecturer at the Department of Aerospace of Tamkang University and in 1991-1992 he was the adjunct associate professor at the Department of Mechanical Engineering of Chung Yuan Christian University.

References

Political office-holders in the Republic of China on Taiwan
Living people
Academic staff of the National Tsing Hua University
Year of birth missing (living people)